Achari may refer to:

Achari (surname), used in South India
 Two communities in India:
Vishwakarma (caste)
Charodi (community)